The 2000 World Junior Hockey Championships (2000 WJHC), was the 24th edition of the Ice Hockey World Junior Championship. The tournament was hosted in Skellefteå and Umeå, Sweden from December 25, 1999, to January 4, 2000. The Czech Republic won the gold medal with a 1–0 shootout victory over Russia in the championship game, while Canada won the bronze medal with a 4–3 shootout victory over the United States. This still remains as the only tournament to where both medal games have been decided in a shootout.

The playoff round was (again) expanded to eight teams, with group leaders not getting a bye to the semifinals.

Venues

Pool A

Preliminary round

Group A

All times local (CET/UTC+1).

Group B

All times local (CET/UTC+1).

Relegation round
Source:

10-minute tie-break game

 was relegated to Division I for the 2001 World Junior Ice Hockey Championships.

Final round
Source:

‡ Shootout victory.

All times local (CET/UTC+1).

Quarterfinals

Consolation round

Semifinals

7th place game

5th place game

Bronze medal game

Gold medal game

Scoring leaders

Goaltending leaders
Minimum 40% of team's ice time.

Tournament awards

Final standings

Pool B
The Pool B tournament was played in Minsk, Belarus between December 13 and December 19, 1999.

Preliminary round

Group A

Group B

Final round

 was promoted to the Top Division for the 2001 World Junior Ice Hockey Championships.

Relegation round

 was relegated to Division II for the 2001 World Junior Ice Hockey Championships.

Pool C
The Pool C tournament was played in Nagano, Japan between December 30, 1999, and January 3, 2000.

Preliminary round

Group A

Group B

Final round
Source:

All times local (JST/UTC+9).

7th place game

 was relegated to Division III for the 2001 World Junior Ice Hockey Championships.

5th place game

3rd place game

1st place game

 was promoted to Division I for the 2001 World Junior Ice Hockey Championships.

Pool D
The Pool D tournament was played in Mexico City, Mexico between January 9 and January 15, 2000.

Preliminary round

Group A

Group B

Group C

Final round

1st–3rd place group

 was promoted to Division II for the 2001 World Junior Ice Hockey Championships.

4th–6th place group

7th–9th place group

 was relegated to Division III Qualification for the 2001 World Junior Ice Hockey Championships.

References

External links
 Official website of IIHF

 
World Junior Ice Hockey Championships
2000 World Junior Ice Hockey Championships
World
2000
World Junior Ice Hockey Championships
World Junior Ice Hockey Championships
Sports competitions in Umeå
Sports competitions in Skellefteå
1990s in Minsk
World Junior Championships
International ice hockey competitions hosted by Belarus
Sports competitions in Nagano (city)
World Junior Championships
International ice hockey competitions hosted by Japan
International ice hockey competitions hosted by Mexico
World Junior Championships
2000s in Mexico City
Sports competitions in Mexico City